Ulrik of Denmark may refer to:

 Ulrik of Denmark (1578–1624), son of King Frederick II of Denmark, Prince-Bishop of Schwerin
 Ulrik of Denmark (1611–1633), son of King Christian IV of Denmark, Prince-Bishop of Schwerin